is a town located in Kamo District, Gifu Prefecture, Japan. , the town had an estimated population of 8,253 and a population density of 640 persons per km2, in 3359 households.

Geography
Sakahogi is located on the edge of the Nōbi Plain in south-central Gifu Prefecture. The town has a climate characterized by hot and humid summers, and mild winters  (Köppen climate classification Cfa).  The average annual temperature in Sakahogi is 15.3 °C. The average annual rainfall is 1975 mm with September as the wettest month. The temperatures are highest on average in August, at around 27.9 °C, and lowest in January, at around 3.6 °C.

Neighbouring municipalities
Gifu Prefecture
Seki
Minokamo
Kakamigahara
Kani
Aichi Prefecture
Inuyama

Demographics
Per Japanese census data, the population of Sakahogi has remained relatively steady over the past 30 years.

History
The area around Sakahogi was part of traditional Mino Province. During the Edo period, it part of Kamo District, and was tenryō directly controlled by the Tokugawa shogunate.  During the post-Meiji restoration cadastral reforms, the area was organised into Kamo District, Gifu Prefecture. The village of Sakahogi was formed on April 1, 1897 with the establishment of the modern municipalities system by the merger of the hamlets of  Sakakura, Torikumi, Ōhari, Kuroiwa, Fukagaya, Katsuyama and Fukada. In 1950 the Fukada part of Sakahogi was merged into the town of Ōta, now a part of Minokamo. Sakahogi was raised to town status on October 1, 1968

Economy
The local economy is dominated by Pajero Manufacturing Co. Ltd., a subsidiary of Mitsubishi Motors, which assembles the Mitsubishi Pajero, a sport utility vehicle, the Mitsubishi Delica, a minivan, and the Mitsubishi Outlander in Sakahogi.

Education
Sakahogi has one public elementary schools and one public middle school operated by the town government. The town does not have a high school. The Nakanihon Automotive College is located in Sakahogi.

Transportation

Railway 
 Central Japan Railway Company -  Takayama Main Line

Highway

Notes

External links

 

 
Towns in Gifu Prefecture